Church of the Holy Trinity, or Holy Trinity Episcopal Church, is a historic Episcopal church located at Churchville, Harford County, Maryland.  It is a stone structure built in 1878 in the Gothic Revival style. Its front facade features a triple window of stained glass, consisting of three Gothic-arched lancet windows  It also features a steep roof, an architectural chancel at the east end, south porch and sacristy, belfry at the west end, and lancet windows and doors with pointed arches.

It was listed on the National Register of Historic Places in 2002.

References

External links
, including photo from 2001, at Maryland Historical Trust

Episcopal church buildings in Maryland
Churches in Harford County, Maryland
Churches on the National Register of Historic Places in Maryland
Churches completed in 1878
19th-century Episcopal church buildings
Churchville, Maryland
National Register of Historic Places in Harford County, Maryland